Jamal Malyar Maseed is a Pakistani politician and one of the leaders of the Pashtun Tahafuz Movement  (PTM). Malyar belongs to the Mahsud tribe of South Waziristan, Pakistan. He is a member of the Pashtunkhwa Milli Awami Party (PMAP).

Political career
In the 2018 Pakistani general election, Jamal Malyar contested NA-49 (Tribal Area-X) South Waziristan as a candidate from the Pashtunkhwa Milli Awami Party (PMAP), but lost to the Muttahida Majlis-e-Amal (MMA) candidate Maulana Jamal ud Din.

In the 2019 Khyber Pakhtunkhwa provincial election, Malyar contested PK-113 (South Waziristan-I) as an independent candidate. However, the administration of South Waziristan restricted him to his house because of which he could not run an election campaign. Hafiz Assamuddin of Jamiat Ulema-e-Islam (F) won the election. "The administration gave me no reason for imposing this sort of house arrest," Malyar said.

Detention in South Waziristan
In September 2017, Malyar and a couple of other human rights activists, namely Manzoor Pashteen and Shah Faisal Ghazi, were detained by the security forces of Pakistan at Barwand check post in Tiarza Tehsil, South Waziristan, because of their protest against landmines in Dera Ismail Khan a few days earlier. However a day later, they were released by the military because of the social media campaign for them by their supporters.

See also

References

Living people
Pashtun people
People from South Waziristan
Pashtun Tahafuz Movement politicians
Pashtunkhwa Milli Awami Party politicians
1992 births
Pakistani prisoners and detainees